Elachista esmeralda is a moth in the family Elachistidae. It was described by Lauri Kaila in 1992. It is found in southern Kazakhstan.

References

Moths described in 1992
esmeralda
Moths of Asia